"Beautiful Things" is a song recorded by Japanese-American singer-songwriter Ai, released on February 4, 2012, by EMI Music Japan as a promotional single from her ninth studio album, Independent. Written by Ai with additional writing credits from producer Rykeyz and composer Redd Stylez, the song served as the closing theme song for Berserk: The Golden Age Arc I: The Egg of the King.

Background 
In October 2011, it was revealed that an unreleased song by Ai, titled "Beautiful Things" would serve as the closing theme song for Berserk: The Golden Age Arc I: The Egg of the King. The song was Ai's first to be featured in a dark fantasy anime film and second in general to be featured in an anime, the first being her 2005 single "Crayon Beats" for Crayon Shin-chan. In order to properly write the song, Ai read the Berserk manga. She stated she was skeptical in reading the manga at first, but by volume 4, she "fell in love with it". While recording the song, Ai stated the song was the most challenging song she had recorded.

Live performances and promotion 
On January 19, 2012, Ai performed "Beautiful Things" at the completion event for the Berserk movie. Hiroaki Iwanaga, who was the voice of the main character, Guts, appeared with Ai dressed in medieval attire at the event. To further promote the song, Ai announced a karaoke event for the song on January 25, 2012, titled Sing Beautiful Things Championship. The winner of the event would be rewarded ¥100k and a chance to perform the song with Ai live at her Independent Tour 2012. The winner of the challenge was Akane Kiyose. Additionally with the Independent Tour 2012, Ai has performed the song at her The Best Tour (2016).

Track listing 
Digital download and streaming

 "Beautiful Things" — 4:45

Charts

Credits and personnel 
Credits adapted from Tidal.

 Ai Uemura – vocals, songwriter
 Ryan "RyKeyz" Williamson – producer, composer, programming
 Sean "Redd Stylez" Fenton  – composer

Release history

Notes

References 
2012 songs
2010s ballads
Ai (singer) songs
Songs written by Ai (singer)
EMI Music Japan singles
Anime songs
Berserk (manga)
Songs written for films